Urocanic acid is an intermediate in the catabolism of L-histidine.

Metabolism
It is formed from L-histidine through the action of histidine ammonialyase (also known as histidase or histidinase) by elimination of ammonium.

In the liver, urocanic acid is transformed by urocanate hydratase (or urocanase) to 4-imidazolone-5-propionic acid and subsequently to glutamic acid.

Clinical significance
Inherited deficiency of urocanase leads to elevated levels of urocanic acid in the urine, a condition known as urocanic aciduria.

An important role for the onset of atopic dermatitis and asthma has been attributed to filaggrin, a skin precursor of urocanic acid.

Urocanic acid is thought to be a significant attractant of the nematode parasite Strongyloides stercoralis, in part because of relatively high levels in the plantar surfaces of the feet, the site through which this parasite often enters the body.

Function 
Urocanic acid was detected in animal sweat and skin where, among other possible functions, it acts as an endogenous sunscreen or photoprotectant against UVB-induced DNA damage. Urocanic acid is found predominantly in the stratum corneum of the skin and it is likely that most of it is derived from filaggrin catabolism (a histidine-rich protein). When exposed to UVB irradiation, trans-urocanic acid is converted in vitro and in vivo to the cis isomer. The cis form is known to activate regulatory T cells.

Some studies attribute filaggrin an important role in keeping the skin surface slightly acidic, through a breaking down mechanism to form histidine and subsequently trans-urocanic acid, however others have shown that the filaggrin–histidine–urocanic acid cascade is not essential for skin acidification.

History
Urocanic acid was first isolated in 1874 by the chemist Max Jaffé from the urine of a dog,  hence the name ( = urine, and canis = dog).

See also 
 Histidinemia
 Inborn error of metabolism

References

External links 
 The Online Metabolic and Molecular Bases of Inherited Disease - Chapter 80 - An overview of disorders of histidine metabolism, including urocanic aciduria.

Imidazoles
Carboxylic acids
Alkene derivatives